Bennewitz is a municipality in the Leipzig district in Saxony, Germany.

History 
Today Bennewitz is a cluster of several villages administered by Bennewitz village. The main village of Bennewitz is one of the oldest settlements in the Mulde-valley. It is probably named after Bono or Bonislaw who settled here about 1200 years ago. The name is of Sorbian (see: Wends) origin, as many geographical names in the area. Its old village core has the shape of a typical Sorbian (Wendish) 'Rundling' village.

Transport 
Bennewitz is situated at the intersection of highway B6 and highway B107. The former connects it with the metropolitan area of Leipzig. The village has a train station which is served by local commuter trains.

References 

Leipzig (district)